Nadia Petrova and Katarina Srebotnik were the defending champions, but Petrova chose not to participate.  Srebotnik played alongside Květa Peschke, but lost in the semifinals to Martina Hingis and Flavia Pennetta.
Chan Hao-ching and Chan Yung-jan won the title, defeating Hingis and Pennetta in the final, 6–3, 5–7, [10–7].

Seeds

Draw

Draw

External links
 Main draw

Aegon Internationalandnbsp;- Doubles
2014 Women's Doubles